Sylvain Lévi (March 28, 1863 – October 30, 1935) was an influential French orientalist and indologist who taught Sanskrit and Indian religion at the École pratique des hautes études.

Lévi's book Théâtre Indien is an important work on the subject of Indian performance art, and Lévi also conducted some of the earliest analysis of Tokharian fragments discovered in Western China. Lévi exerted a significant influence on the life and thought of Marcel Mauss, the nephew of Émile Durkheim.

Co-Founds the École française d'Extrême-Orient in Hanoi, Vietnam
Sylvain Lévi was a co-founder of the École française d'Extrême-Orient in Hanoi.

According to the Universal Jewish Encyclopedia, Lévi was the (one of the) founder(s) of the École française d'Extrême-Orient (EFEO) (French School of the Far East) in Hanoi.  The École française d'Extrême-Orient's website notes that the school was founded in Hanoi in 1902. One of his students, Suzanne Karpelès, the first female member of EFEO, joined him there in 1922 and remained in French Indochina until 1941.

Opinions
He was also an early opponent of the traditionalist author René Guénon, citing the latter's uncritical belief in a "Perennial philosophy", that a primal truth revealed directly to primitive humanity, based on an extreme reductionist view of Hinduism, which was the subject of Guénon's first book, L'Introduction générale a l'étude des doctrines hindoues. That was a thesis delivered to Lévi at the Sorbonne and rejected.

Works 

 Le Théâtre Indien, Deuxième tirage, 1963, Publié à l'occasion du centenaire de la naissance de Sylvain Lévi, Bibliothèque de l'Ecole des Hautes Etudes, IVe section, 83e Fascicule, Paris, Distributeur exclusif: Librairie Honoré Champion.
 Lévi, S. 1898. La doctrine du sacrifice dans les Brâhmanas, Paris : Ernest Leroux, Bibliothèque de l’École des Hautes Études-Sciences religieuses [= BÉHÉ-SR], vol. 11.
 Lévi, S. 1966. Id., avec une préface de L. Renou, 2e éd., Paris : Presses Universitaires de France, BÉHÉ-SR, vol. 73.
 Lévi, S. 2003. Id., réimpr. de Lévi 1966, avec une postface inédite de Ch. Malamoud, Brepols : Turnhout, BÉHÉ-SR, vol. 118.
 Le Népal: Étude historique d’un royaume hindou, Sylvain Lévi, 3 vol. 1905–08, Paris
 Nepal: Historical study of a Hindu kingdom, Sylvain Levi, Ancient Nepal, 44 installments, 1973–90.
 Asvaghosa, le sutralamkara et ses sources, S. Lévi, JA, 1908, 12, p. 57-193
 Autour d'Asvaghosa, Sylvain Lévi, JA, Oc-Déc. 1929, p. 281-283
 Kanishka et Satavahana, Sylvain Lévi, JA, Jan–Mars 1936, p. 103-107
 Le Bouddhisme et les Grecs, S. Lévi, R.H.R. 23 (1891), p. 37
 L'énigme des 256 nuits d'Asoka, Sylvain Lévi, JA 1948, p. 143-153
 Les études orientales, par Sylvain Lévi, Annales du musée Guimet numéro 36, Hachette 1911, ANU DS1.P32.t36
 Les grands hommes dans l'histoire de l'Inde, par Sylvain Lévi, Annales du musée Guimet numéro 40, Hachette 1913, ANU A DS1.P32.t40
 Les seize Arhats protecteurs de la loi, Sylvain Lévi et Édouard Chavannes, JA 1916, vol. II, p. 204-275
 Le sutra du sage et du fou, Sylvain Lévi, JA, Oc-Déc. 1925, p. 320-326, ANU pBL1411.A82.L4
 L'inde civilisatrice, aperçu historique, S. Lévi, Paris 1938
 L'Inde et le Monde, par Sylvain Lévi, Honoré Champion 1926, ANU G B131.L4
 Madhyantavibhangatika, tr. S. Lévi ?, ANU BQ2965.Y3
 Mahayanasutralamkara, exposé de la doctrine du Grand Véhicule selon le système Yogachara, tr. française Sylvain Lévi, Librairie Honoré Champion, 5 Quai Malaquais, Paris 1911, réimpression Rinsen Book Co. Kyoto 1983 ANU BQ3002.L48.1983.t2
 Maitreya, le consolateur, S. Lévi, Mélanges Linossier, II, pp. 362–3 & pp. 355–402
 Matériaux pour l'étude du système Vijnaptimatra, Sylvain Lévi, Paris Chanmpion 1932
 Nairatmyapariprccha, Sylvain Lévi, JA, Oct-Déc. 1928, p. 209-215
 Notes indiennes, Sylvain Lévi, JA, Janv. Mars 1925, p. 26-35
 Notes sur les manuscrits sanscrits provenant de Bamiyan et de Gilgit, S. Lévi
 Observations sur une langue précanonique du bouddhisme, S. Lévi, JA Nov-Déc. 1912, p. 511
 Sur la récitation primitive des textes bouddhiques, Sylvain Lévi, JA, Mai-Juin 1915, p. 401-407
 Une langue précanonique du bouddhisme, S. Lévi, JA 1912, p. 495-514
 Vijnaptimatratasiddhi, Sylvain Lévi, Paris 1925, ANU AA BL1405.B8
 Vimsika-Vimsatika de Vasubandhu, tr. S. Lévi, Bibliothèque de l'École des Hautes Etudes fascicule 245-1925 et 260-1932 Paris
JA = Journal Asiatique

References

Sources
 Louis Renou (1996). Mémorial Sylvain Lévi. Éd. Motilal Banarsidass Publ. 
 Lyne Bansat-Boudon; Roland Lardinois; Isabelle Ratié (2007), Sylvain Lévi (1863-1935) : études indiennes, histoire sociale: actes du colloque tenu à Paris les 8-10 octobre 2003, Turnhout: Brepols
 Goloubew, Victor (1935). Sylvain Lévi et l'Indochine, Bulletin de l'École française d'Extrême-Orient 35 (1), 550-574
 Bloch, Jules (1937). Sylvain Lévi, École pratique des hautes études, Section des sciences historiques et philologiques 70 (1), 39-43

External links

 Biography, Jewish Encyclopedia

1863 births
1935 deaths
French scholars of Buddhism
French Indologists
19th-century French Jews
Jewish Nepalese history
Jewish Vietnamese history
Linguists from France
Members of the Société Asiatique
Newar studies scholars
People associated with Santiniketan
Academic staff of the University of Paris